Kingdoms of Fire is an Arabic historical drama television series about the reign of Ottoman Empire's Selim I and Mamluk Sultanate's Tuman bay II, created by Muhammed Abdulmalik and directed by British director Peter Webber.

The 14-episodes series is produced by Genomedia Studios with a budget of $40 million, financed and supported by the government of Saudi Arabia and the United Arab Emirates, the originator of the movie, and filmed in Tunisia, debuted on MBC channels on 17 November 2019.

The second season is under development process.

Fatima Bhutto of Foreign Policy wrote that the show is "an expensive salvo against Turkey’s cultural neo-Ottomanism" and that the director was chosen for "added cachet".

Overview 
The series depicts events that took place between Egypt, Syria and the Ottoman Empire between the 15th and the 16th century. It demonstrates the competition between the Mamluks and the Ottomans over the control of the Middle East, through the rise of two main characters, Tuman bay II, the last Sultan of the Mamluks in Cairo, and Sultan Selim I of Istanbul.

Cast 

 Rafic Ali Ahmad, Mehmed the Conqueror
 Abdulmonem Amairy, Bayezid II
 Rashid Assaf, Al-Ashraf Qansuh al-Ghuri
 Nadine Tahseen Bek, Gülbahar Hatun
 Khaled El Nabawy, Tuman bay II
 Mahmoud Nasr, Selim I
 Hala Rajab, Ayşe Hatun
 Kosai Al-Shofi, Suleiman the Magnificent
 Souhir Ben Amara, Hafsa Sultan
 Yassine Ben Gamra, Kurtbay
 Fethi Haddaoui, Qaitbay Al-Ragbi
 Alaa Al-Zuabi, Şehzade Ahmet
 Ramez Al-Aswad, Hadım Sinan Pasha
 Yamen Fayoumy, Sultan Cem
 Nedal Nejem, Hayır Bey
 Shadi Safadi, Yunus Pasha
 Saad Minah, Janbirdi al-Ghazali
 Farazdaq Dyub, Şehzade Korkut

 Ahmad Harhash as Ahmed

Reception
Bhutto, a Pakistani journalist, stated in 2020 that the show in terms of an anti-Ottomanist production "has apparently failed; no one seems to be watching" in Pakistan.

Criticism 
Multiple comments from the Turkish side after the episodes aired characterized the show as harassment targeted at Turkey and as anti-Ottoman, reflecting recent tensions between Turkey and both Saudi Arabia and the United Arab Emirates; This was during a time when Turkey had been trying to assert its Ottoman identity and its rule over Arabs.

References

External links 
 

2019 Egyptian television series debuts
Arabic television series
Fiction set in the 1510s
Television series about the Ottoman Empire
Television series set in the 16th century
Films directed by Peter Webber